The 2022 Michigan Wolverines softball team was an American college softball team that represented the University of Michigan during the 2022 NCAA Division I softball season. The Wolverines, were led by head coach Carol Hutchins in her thirty-eighth season, and played their home games at Alumni Field in Ann Arbor, Michigan.

Previous season
The Wolverines finished the 2021 season 38–8 overall, and 36–6 in the Big Ten, finishing in first place in their conference. Following the conclusion of the regular season, the Wolverines received an automatic bid to the 2021 NCAA Division I softball tournament after winning the Big Ten Conference regular season championship and were defeated in the Regional Final by Washington.

Roster

Schedule and results

Notes:
  The April 2 game at Northwestern was suspended due to snow in the top of the third inning with the game still scoreless. It was completed on April 3 prior to the regularly scheduled game that afternoon.

Rankings

References

Michigan
Michigan Wolverines softball
Michigan Wolverines softball seasons
Michigan